The men's team pursuit race of the 2014–15 ISU Speed Skating World Cup 3, arranged in Sportforum Hohenschönhausen, in Berlin, Germany, was held on 5 December 2014.

The Polish team won the race, while the South Korean team came second, and the Dutch team came third.

Results
The race took place on Friday, 5 December, in the afternoon session, scheduled at 18:21.

Notes: NR = national record.

References

Men team pursuit
3